Ixonanthes khasiana is a species of plant in the Ixonanthaceae family. It is endemic to northeast India.  It is threatened by habitat loss.

References

Ixonanthaceae
Flora of Assam (region)
Vulnerable plants
Taxonomy articles created by Polbot